Bantry is a locality in Alberta, Canada.

Bantry takes its name from Bantry Bay, in Ireland.

References 

Localities in the County of Newell